Jibola Dabo  is a Nigerian actor who won the award for Best actor of the year at the Zuma Film Festival (ZUFF). He was described as a Nollywood veteran by a Vanguard media publication.

Early life and education
Dabo was born in Lagos state, a geographical area of south-western Nigeria that is occupied predominantly by the Yoruba speaking people of Nigeria. Dabo is originally from Owo, a small town in Ondo State, Nigeria. Dabo received most of his formal education in Nigeria from elementary to college level. He graduated from the University of Lagos with a Bachelor’s Degree in Fine Arts. Dabo after his education in Nigeria pursued further education in the United States of America in pursuit of a Master’s Degree. He attended Columbia State University & graduated with a Master’s Degree in Mass Media.

Career
Dabo reportedly started acting at the age of 6, in school, where he took part in stage dramas. Dabo’s official debut into the Nigerian movie industry, Nollywood was in 2006.

In what can be described as Nollywood’s most provocative movie of 2009 & most significant of Dabo’s career was a movie titled Dirty Secrets which he featured in & worked alongside Tonto Dikeh and now deceased Nollywood actor; Muna Obiekwe.

Awards
Best actor of the year at the Zuma Film Festival (ZUFF).

Political ambition
Dabo in 2015 had political aspirations to represent Owo federal constituency in Ondo State at the Federal House of Representatives In Nigeria.

Personal life
Dabo & Binta Ayo Mogaji have a child together.

Selected filmography
Bloody Carnival
My Fantasy
Broken Mirror
My Game
High Blood Pressure
Changing Faces
Kingdom of Darkness
Break Away
Game Changer
Dirty Secrets (with Tonto Dikeh & Muna Obiekwe).
Queen of the World
 The Silent Baron

References

External links
 IMDb Page of Jibola Dabo

Living people
Nigerian male film actors
Yoruba male actors
University of Lagos alumni
Male actors from Lagos State
Year of birth missing (living people)
People from Owo
Actors from Ondo State